Strange New World is an American made-for-television science fiction film which first aired on July 13, 1975 on ABC. It stars John Saxon as Captain Anthony Vico (PAX team leader), Kathleen Miller as Dr. Allison Crowley (team navigator and communications expert), and Keene Curtis as Dr. William Scott (team physician/medical doctor).

Strange New World was originally a TV pilot and the third attempt to create a series around a post-apocalyptic future created by Gene Roddenberry. The first two, Genesis II and Planet Earth (the latter also starring Saxon in the lead role), explored Earth after a nuclear war and focused on an organization called PAX that was working to bring peace and order to the world. Roddenberry was closely involved with the previous two incarnations, but not with Strange New World and he is not credited. Character names, as well as some of the main points of the concept were changed to avoid any potential litigation. The title of the film was borrowed from the famous opening monologue of Roddenberry's Star Trek.

Strange New World is considered by many observers to have been the weakest of the three productions which envisaged the world of PAX. Like the previous attempts, it was not developed into a weekly series.

Unlike the previous versions, which focused on a single cryogenically frozen survivor working for an established organisation called PAX, Strange New World had three astronauts return to Earth after being cryogenically frozen and looking to re-establish the organisation (PAX) that had sent them into space. The opening of the movie introduced the PAX team members and described the disaster which befell the Earth (a swarm of giant asteroids). PAX headquarters changed the orbit of their space station so that it would orbit the sun and return to Earth in 180 years, during which time its crew and hundreds of volunteer personnel located below PAX headquarters, would remain in suspended animation. Upon returning to Earth, the astronauts' primary mission was to make their way back to PAX headquarters and revive their colleagues.

References

External links

1975 American television episodes
Films about astronauts
American science fiction television films
Television films as pilots
Television pilots not picked up as a series
American post-apocalyptic films
Films directed by Robert Butler
1970s American films
1970s English-language films